Earl Purdy (June 6, 1892 – April 22, 1971) was an American painter. His work was part of the painting event in the art competition at the 1932 Summer Olympics.

References

1892 births
1971 deaths
20th-century American painters
American male painters
Olympic competitors in art competitions
People from Cohoes, New York
20th-century American male artists